Maria Kardum (born 21 July 1968) is a retired Swedish swimmer who won a bronze medal at the 1985 European Aquatics Championships. She competed in four freestyle and medley events at the 1984 Summer Olympics with the best achievement of seventh place in the 4×100 m freestyle relay.

References

External links
Maria Kardum. Sveriges Olympiska Kommitté

1968 births
Swimmers at the 1984 Summer Olympics
Living people
Olympic swimmers of Sweden
European Aquatics Championships medalists in swimming
Swedish female freestyle swimmers
People from Kristianstad Municipality
Sportspeople from Skåne County
20th-century Swedish women